Eduardo Testa is a Brazil-born soccer player who represented the USA in the first ever FIFA Beach Soccer World Cup in Rio de Janeiro 2005. Testa played both group matches against Japan and Portugal and scored one goal in the competition.

References

American beach soccer players
Living people
Year of birth missing (living people)
Brazilian emigrants to the United States
Brazilian beach soccer players